The Mathur block is a revenue block in the Krishnagiri district of Tamil Nadu, India. It has a total of 24 panchayat villages.

References 
 

Revenue blocks of Krishnagiri district